Groove Elation is an album by the jazz guitarist John Scofield, released in 1995. It features keyboardist Larry Goldings, bassist Dennis Irwin, percussionist Don Alias and drummer Idris Muhammad, as well as a four piece horn section led by trumpeter Randy Brecker.

Critical reception

The Washington Post wrote that Scofield "balances crisp articulation with cool legato passages, jarring intervals with catchy melodies, acoustic warmth with electric bite and soul." The Globe and Mail determined that "the two pieces on Groove Elation that feature Scofield on acoustic guitar are rather ordinary, but several of the other eight are irresistible, none more than the title track, 'Kool' and 'Big Top'."

Track listing

Personnel
 John Scofield – acoustic & electric guitar
 Randy Brecker – trumpet, flugelhorn
 Steve Turre – trombone
 Billy Drewes – tenor saxophone, flute
 Howard Johnson – baritone saxophone, tuba, bass clarinet
 Larry Goldings – piano, organ
 Dennis Irwin – double bass
 Idris Muhammad – drums
 Don Alias – percussion

References 

1995 albums
John Scofield albums
Blue Note Records albums